HAWC may refer to:

 High Altitude Water Cherenkov Experiment, a gamma-ray observatory in Mexico
 HAWC, a far-infrared telescope aboard NASA's SOFIA project
 Wacca Airport, Ethiopia, ICAO code HAWC
 Hypersonic Air-breathing Weapon Concept, a hypersonic weapon project
 Heavy Armored Weapon Chassis, a combat vehicle in the 1997 video game G-Nome